In geometry, the truncated order-6 square tiling is a uniform tiling of the hyperbolic plane. It has Schläfli symbol of t{4,6}.

Uniform colorings

Symmetry 

The dual tiling represents the fundamental domains of the *443 orbifold symmetry. There are two reflective subgroup kaleidoscopic constructed from [(4,4,3)] by removing one or two of three mirrors. In these images fundamental domains are alternately colored black and cyan, and mirrors exist on the boundaries between colors. 

A larger subgroup is constructed [(4,4,3*)], index 6, as (3*22) with gyration points removed, becomes (*222222).

The symmetry can be doubled as 642 symmetry by adding a mirror bisecting the fundamental domain.

Related polyhedra and tilings 
From a Wythoff construction there are eight hyperbolic uniform tilings that can be based from the regular order-4 hexagonal tiling. 

Drawing the tiles colored as red on the original faces, yellow at the original vertices, and blue along the original edges, there are 8 forms.

It can also be generated from the (4 4 3) hyperbolic tilings:

See also

Square tiling
Tilings of regular polygons
List of uniform planar tilings
List of regular polytopes

References
 John H. Conway, Heidi Burgiel, Chaim Goodman-Strass, The Symmetries of Things 2008,  (Chapter 19, The Hyperbolic Archimedean Tessellations)

External links 

 Hyperbolic and Spherical Tiling Gallery
 KaleidoTile 3: Educational software to create spherical, planar and hyperbolic tilings
 Hyperbolic Planar Tessellations, Don Hatch

Hyperbolic tilings
Isogonal tilings
Order-6 tilings
Square tilings
Truncated tilings
Uniform tilings